Topless (Toppuresu) is a 2008 Japanese film directed by Eiji Uchida.

Cast
 Shimizu Mina as Natsuko
 Erika Okuda as Tomomi
 Aya Ōmasa as Kana
 So Sakamoto as Koji
 Ryunosuke Kawai as Kenta
 Hako as Noriko
 Sayoko Kobayashi as Miyo

References

Further reading
 Interview with the cast and creators of "Topless" by Tokyo Wrestling

External links
  (in Japanese)
  Topless at FilmAffinity
 

2008 films
2008 LGBT-related films
Japanese comedy-drama films
2000s Japanese-language films
Japanese LGBT-related films
Lesbian-related films
2000s Japanese films